Mia-Rae Clifford (born 10 August 1986) is an Australian rules footballer who played for Melbourne, Geelong, and Fremantle in the AFL Women's (AFLW) competition.

AFLW career

Melbourne
Clifford was drafted by Melbourne with their twelfth selection and eighty-ninth overall in the 2016 AFL Women's draft. She played every match in her debut season to finish with seven games. She was not retained on Melbourne's list at the end of the season and was subsequently delisted in May 2017.

Geelong
In August 2018, Clifford joined AFLW expansion club, Geelong. In April 2019, Clifford was delisted by Geelong.

Fremantle
In April 2019, Clifford was signed as a delisted free agent by Fremantle. In August 2020, she was delisted by Fremantle.

Essendon
In November 2020, Clifford was signed by Essendon Football Club as a member of their women's VFLW team. Clifford was named as the leading goal kicker for the 2021 season. At the beginning of the 2022 season, Clifford was promoted to the role of Co-Captain alongside Georgia Nanscawen. The pair went on to lead the team, alongside Head Coach Brendan Major, to an undefeated season, finishing as Major Premiers in the 2022 Rebel VFLW Grand Final at Port Melbourne ETU Stadium in July 2022.

Personal life
, Clifford was engaged to Collingwood's Penny Cula-Reid. The pair have been referred to as the first openly gay couple in the league.

References

External links 

1986 births
Living people
Melbourne Football Club (AFLW) players
Australian rules footballers from Victoria (Australia)
Lesbian sportswomen
Australian LGBT sportspeople
Geelong Football Club (AFLW) players
LGBT players of Australian rules football
Victorian Women's Football League players
Fremantle Football Club (AFLW) players

Indigenous Australian players of Australian rules football